Sodium nitrite is an inorganic compound with the chemical formula NaNO2. It is a white to slightly yellowish crystalline powder that is very soluble in water and is hygroscopic. From an industrial perspective, it is the most important nitrite salt. It is a precursor to a variety of organic compounds, such as pharmaceuticals, dyes, and pesticides, but it is probably best known as a food additive used in processed meats and (in some countries) in fish products.

Uses

Industrial chemistry 
The main use of sodium nitrite is for the industrial production of organonitrogen compounds. It is a reagent for conversion of amines into diazo compounds, which are key precursors to many dyes, such as diazo dyes. Nitroso compounds are produced from nitrites. These are used in the rubber industry.

It is used in a variety of metallurgical applications, for phosphatizing and detinning.

Sodium nitrite is an effective corrosion inhibitor and is used as an additive in industrial greases, as an aqueous solution in closed loop cooling systems, and in a molten state as a heat transfer medium.

Food additive and preservative 
Sodium nitrite is used to speed up the curing of meat and also impart an attractive pink color. Nitrite reacts with the meat myoglobin to cause color changes, first converting to nitrosomyoglobin (bright red), then, on heating, to nitrosohemochrome (a pink pigment).

Historically, salt has been used for the preservation of meat. The salt-preserved meatproduct was usually brownish-gray in color. When sodium nitrite is added with the salt, the meat develops a red, then pink color, which is associated with cured meats such as ham, bacon, hot dogs, and bologna.

In the early 1900s, irregular curing was commonplace. This led to further research surrounding the use of sodium nitrite as an additive in food, standardizing the amount present in foods to minimize the amount needed while maximizing its food additive role. Through this research, sodium nitrite has been found to give taste and color to the meat and inhibit lipid oxidation that leads to rancidity, with varying degrees of effectiveness for controlling growth of disease-causing microorganisms. The ability of sodium nitrite to address the above-mentioned issues has led to production of meat with extended storage life and has improved desirable color and taste. According to scientists working for the meat industry, nitrite has improved food safety. This view is disputed in the light of its ineffectiveness against botulism and the possible carcinogenic effects caused by adding nitrites to meat.

Nitrite has the E number E250. Potassium nitrite (E249) is used in the same way. It is approved for usage in the EU, USA and Australia and New Zealand.

In meat-processing, sodium nitrite is never used in a pure state but always mixed with common salt. This mixture is known as nitrited salt, curing salt or nitrited curing salt. In Europe, nitrited curing salt contains between 99.1% and 99.5% common
salt and between 0.5% and 0.9% nitrite. In the US, nitrited curing salt is dosed at 6% and must be remixed with salt before use.

Color and taste 
The appearance and taste of meat is an important component of consumer acceptance. Sodium nitrite is responsible for the desirable red color (or shaded pink) of meat. Very little nitrite is needed to induce this change. It has been reported that as little as 2 to 14 parts per million (ppm) is needed to induce this desirable color change. However, to extend the lifespan of this color change, significantly higher levels are needed. The mechanism responsible for this color change is the formation of nitrosylating agents by nitrite, which has the ability to transfer nitric oxide that subsequently reacts with myoglobin to produce the cured meat color. The unique taste associated with cured meat is also affected by the addition of sodium nitrite. However, the mechanism underlying this change in taste is still not fully understood.

Inhibition of microbial growth 
A 2018 study by the British Meat Producers Association determined that legally permitted levels of nitrite have no effect on the growth of the Clostridium botulinum bacteria which causes botulism, in line with the UK's Advisory Committee on the Microbiological Safety of Food opinion that nitrites are not required to prevent C. botulinum growth and extend shelf life.  In some countries, cured-meat products are manufactured without nitrites. For example, Parma ham, which has been produced without nitrite since 1993, was reported in 2018 to have caused no cases of botulism.

Sodium nitrite has shown varying degrees of effectiveness for controlling growth of other spoilage or disease causing microorganisms. Although the inhibitory mechanisms are not well known, its effectiveness depends on several factors including residual nitrite level, pH, salt concentration, reductants present and iron content. The type of bacteria also affects sodium nitrite's effectiveness. It is generally agreed that sodium nitrite is not effective for controlling Gram-negative enteric pathogens such as Salmonella and Escherichia coli.

Other food additives (such as lactate and sorbate) provide similar protection against bacteria, but do not provide the desired pink color.

Inhibition of lipid peroxidation 
Sodium nitrite is also able to effectively delay the development of oxidative rancidity. Lipid peroxidation is considered to be a major reason for the deterioration of quality of meat products (rancidity and unappetizing flavors). Sodium nitrite acts as an antioxidant in a mechanism similar to the one responsible for the coloring effect. Nitrite reacts with heme proteins and metal ions, neutralizing free radicals by nitric oxide (one of its byproducts). Neutralization of these free radicals terminates the cycle of lipid oxidation that leads to rancidity.

Medication 

Sodium nitrite is used as a medication together with sodium thiosulfate to treat cyanide poisoning. It is recommended only in severe cases of cyanide poisoning. In those who have both cyanide poisoning and carbon monoxide poisoning sodium thiosulfate by itself is usually recommended. It is given by slow injection into a vein.

Side effects can include low blood pressure, headache, shortness of breath, loss of consciousness, and vomiting. Greater care should be taken in people with underlying heart disease. The patient's levels of methemoglobin should be regularly checked during treatment. While not well studied during pregnancy, there is some evidence of potential harm to the baby. Sodium nitrite is believed to work by creating methemoglobin that then binds with cyanide and thus removes it from the mitochondria.

Sodium nitrite came into medical use in the 1920s and 1930s. It is on the World Health Organization's List of Essential Medicines.

Suicide 
Several academic publications in 2020 and 2021 have discussed the toxicity of sodium nitrite, and an apparent recent increase in suicides from using sodium nitrite which had been ordered online. The usage of sodium nitrite as a suicide method has been heavily discussed on suicide forums, primarily Sanctioned Suicide. Sodium nitrite was also the culprit of the McCarthy et al. v Amazon lawsuit alleging that Amazon knowingly assisted in the deaths of healthy children by selling them "suicide kits" as Amazon's "frequently bought together" feature recommended buying sodium nitrite, an antiemetic and a suicide instruction book together. The online marketplace eBay has globally prohibited the sale of sodium nitrite since 2019.

Toxicity 
Sodium nitrite is toxic. The LD50 in rats is 180 mg/kg and in human LDLo is 71 mg/kg. Yet, death by sodium nitrite ingestion can happen at lower dose. Sodium nitrite has been used for homicide. To prevent accidental intoxication, sodium nitrite (blended with salt) sold as a food additive in the US is dyed bright pink to avoid mistaking it for plain salt or sugar. In other countries, nitrited curing salt is not dyed but is strictly regulated.

Occurrence in vegetables 
Nitrites are not naturally occurring in vegetables in significant quantities. Boiling vegetables does not affect nitrite levels.

The presence of nitrite in animal tissue is a consequence of metabolism of nitric oxide, an important neurotransmitter. Nitric oxide can be created de novo from nitric oxide synthase utilizing arginine or from ingested nitrite.

Pigs 
Because of sodium nitrite's high level of toxicity to swine (Sus scrofa) it is now being developed in Australia to control feral pigs and wild boar. The sodium nitrite induces methemoglobinemia in swine, i.e. it reduces the amount of oxygen that is released from hemoglobin, so the animal will feel faint and pass out, and then die in a humane manner after first being rendered unconscious. The Texas Parks and Wildlife Department operates a research facility at Kerr Wildlife Management Area, where they examine feral pig feeding preferences and bait tactics to administer sodium nitrite.

Cancer 
Carcinogenicity is the ability or tendency of a chemical to induce tumors, increase their incidence or malignancy, or shorten the time of tumor occurrence.

Adding nitrites to meat has been shown to generate known carcinogens such as nitrosamines; the World Health Organization (WHO) advises that each  of "processed meats" eaten a day would raise the risk of getting bowel cancer by 18% over a lifetime. The World Health Organization's review of more than 400 studies concluded, in 2015, that there was sufficient evidence that "processed meats" caused cancer, particularly colon cancer; the WHO's International Agency for Research on Cancer (IARC) classified "processed meats" as carcinogenic to humans (Group 1); "processed meat" meaning meat that has been transformed through salting, curing, fermentation, smoking, or other processes to enhance flavour or improve preservation.).

Nitrosamines can be formed during the curing process used to preserve meats, when sodium nitrite-treated meat is cooked, and also from the reaction of nitrite with secondary amines under acidic conditions (such as occurs in the human stomach). Dietary sources of nitrosamines include US cured meats preserved with sodium nitrite as well as the dried salted fish eaten in Japan. In the 1920s, a significant change in US meat curing practices resulted in a 69% decrease in average nitrite content. This event preceded the beginning of a dramatic decline in gastric cancer mortality. Around 1970, it was found that ascorbic acid (vitamin C), an antioxidant, inhibits nitrosamine formation. Consequently, the addition of at least 550 ppm of ascorbic acid is required in meats manufactured in the United States. Manufacturers sometimes instead use erythorbic acid, a cheaper but equally effective isomer of ascorbic acid. Additionally, manufacturers may include α-tocopherol (vitamin E) to further inhibit nitrosamine production. α-Tocopherol, ascorbic acid, and erythorbic acid all inhibit nitrosamine production by their oxidation-reduction properties. Ascorbic acid, for example, forms dehydroascorbic acid when oxidized, which when in the presence of nitrosonium, a potent nitrosating agent formed from sodium nitrite, reduces the nitrosonium into nitric oxide. The nitrosonium ion formed in acidic nitrite solutions is commonly mislabeled nitrous anhydride, an unstable nitrogen oxide that cannot exist in vitro.

Ingesting nitrite under conditions that result in endogenous nitrosation has been classified as "probably carcinogenic to humans" by International Agency for Research on Cancer (IARC).

Sodium nitrite consumption has also been linked to the triggering of migraines in individuals who already experience them.

One study has found a correlation between highly frequent ingestion of meats cured with pink salt and the COPD form of lung disease. The study's researchers suggest that the high amount of nitrites in the meats was responsible; however, the team did not prove the nitrite theory. Additionally, the study does not prove that nitrites or cured meat caused higher rates of COPD, merely a link. The researchers did adjust for many of COPD's risk factors, but they commented they cannot rule out all possible unmeasurable causes or risks for COPD.

Production 
Industrial production of sodium nitrite follows one of two processes, the reduction of nitrate salts, or the oxidation of lower nitrogen oxides.

One method uses molten sodium nitrate as the salt, and lead which is oxidized, while a more modern method uses scrap iron filings to reduce the nitrate.

A more commonly used method involves the general reaction of nitrogen oxides in alkaline aqueous solution, with the addition of a catalyst. The exact conditions depend on which nitrogen oxides are used, and what the oxidant is, as the conditions need to be carefully controlled to avoid over oxidation of the nitrogen atom.

Sodium nitrite has also been produced by reduction of nitrate salts by exposure to heat, light, ionizing radiation, metals, hydrogen, and electrolytic reduction.

Chemical reactions 

In the laboratory, sodium nitrite can be used to destroy excess sodium azide.
2 NaN3 + 2 NaNO2 + 4 H^+ -> 3 N2 + 2 NO + 4 Na^+ + 2 H2O

Above 330 °C sodium nitrite decomposes (in air) to sodium oxide, nitric oxide and nitrogen dioxide.
2 NaNO2 -> Na2O + NO + NO2

Sodium nitrite can also be used in the production of nitrous acid:
2NaNO2 + H2SO4 ->2 HNO2 + Na2SO4

The nitrous acid then, under normal conditions, decomposes:
2 HNO2 -> NO2 + NO + H2O

The resulting nitrogen dioxide hydrolyzes to a mixture of nitric and nitrous acids:
2 NO2 + H2O -> HNO3 + HNO2

Isotope labelling 15N 

In organic synthesis isotope enriched sodium nitrite-15N can be used instead of normal sodium nitrite as their reactivity is nearly identical in most reactions.

The obtained products carry isotope 15N and hence Nitrogen NMR can be efficiently carried out.

References

Sources

Further reading

External links 
 Drug information portal at the U.S. National Library of Medicine
 International Chemical Safety Card 1120.
 Nitrite in Meat

Antidotes
Color fixers
Corrosion inhibitors
Curing agents
E-number additives
Food additives
Garde manger
Nitrites
Oxidizing agents
Preservatives
Sodium compounds
World Health Organization essential medicines
Orphan drugs
Unassessed Suicide articles
Suicide
X
Suicide methods